Marnie Andrews (born 1951 in Cedartown, Georgia) is an American stage and television actress ER, JAG, Murder One, "Reasonable Doubts", (with Mark Harmon and Marlee Matlin) (1991-1993), The Wonder Years and made for TV movies "Line of Fire: The Morris Dees Story," (1991), Shattered Mind (1996), among others. Much of her stage work comes from the development of new plays.  She has originated numerous roles in world premieres, several as a member of New Jersey Repertory Company.  Andrews is also a director of theatre.  As a singer and lyricist, she has composed with Christopher McHale, and Tyler Orr Sterrett.

As writer and poet (with articles published in such magazines as Natural History, CR, Amica and American Theatre), she writes often of her travels with Jeff Jacobson.  Her writing focusses on the issues of environmental protection, working within the community to effect change, and the advantages of long, sustaining friendships.  Also a teacher. at New York University, University of Southern California Graduate Film School, and SUNY/Albany.

Personal
Married photographer Jeff Jacobson in 1979.  Their son, Henry Jacobson, is a film director, producer and co-owner of Mind Hive Films http://mindhivefilms.com.

Marnie is a subject of books, including "50 Hours" by Eugene Richards and "The Last Roll" by Jeff Jacobson

Theater

As actor
 Emily, "The Realization of Emily Linder," by Richard Strand World Premiere, New Jersey Repertory Company.
 http://www.broadwayworld.com/new-jersey/article/BWW-Interviews-Marnie-Andrews-in-THE-REALIZATION-OF-EMILY-LINDER-at-NJ-Rep-2015040858#
 Amanda, "The Glass Menagerie" by Tennessee Williams Oklahoma State University Theatre Department, 2011, Guest Artist
 Evelyn,  'Til Summer Comes by Mark McNease, New Jersey Repertory Company, 2002
 Rosemary, Touch of Rapture by Mary Fengar Gail, New Jersey Repertory Company, 2005
 Madeline Livingston, The Women of Lockerbie by Deborah Brevoort, New Jersey Repertory Company, 2006
multiple roles, "Play by Play," Stageworks Hudson, Hudson, NY.

Much of her career she worked with playwrights as an actor, director, and dramaturge developing new plays.  Member of Plays in Progress, Hudson Opera House, Hudson, NY, and New Jersey Repertory Company.

Filmography
 Jack Goes Home Independent Film 2015
 Love Is Hell Independent Film, 2008
 ER
 "Union Station" (1996) TV Episode
 Shattered Mind (1996) TV Movie
 JAG
 "Hemlock" (1996) TV Episode
 Murder One
 "Chapter Sixteen" (1996) TV Episode
 The Wonder Years
 "Unpacking" (1993) TV Episode
 Reasonable Doubts 1991-1993 Multiple Episodes
 "Two Women" (1993) TV Episode
 "Mercury in Retrograde" (1992) TV Episode
 "Moment of Doubt" (1992) TV Episode
 "Maggie Finds Her Soul" (1992) TV Episode
 "Dicky's Got the Blues" (1991) TV Episode
 Writer's Block (1991) TV Movie
 L.A. Law
 "Watts a Matter?" (1990) TV Episode
 Roe v. Wade (movie)|Roe v. Wade (1989) TV Movie

Director
"The Mousetrap", Guest Director, Eastern Illinois University.  'Fifth of July", by Lanford Wilson SUNY/Albany, 2011 Merit Award in Ensemble Work and Technical Achievement, American College Theatre Festival,
"Family:  Can't Live with Them, Can't Live Without Them", one-acts, including works by James Farrell, U/Albany, 2008,
"Trojan Women" adaptation by Steven Wolfson, Getty Museum, Los Angeles, CA 1999.

Writer
Berrilla Kerr Playwrights Award. 2004.
Based on the writing "Survival Secrets."

Poem-"The Trees of Miller Road" published in "The Last Roll," Daylight Books, 2013

Various magazine articles, see www.marnieandrews.com

References

External links

1951 births
Living people
American television actresses
American stage actresses
20th-century American dramatists and playwrights
People from Cedartown, Georgia
Actresses from Georgia (U.S. state)
20th-century American actresses
21st-century American women